Stamp and Go is a fish fritter made with salt fish in Jamaican cuisine. It is part of a Jamaican breakfast. It is referred to as one of the original fast foods in Jamaica. The unusual name is supposed to have derived from the 18th-century British sailing ships. If an officer wanted something to be done in a hurry the order was "Stamp and Go!". Bite-sized fritters are often served with tangy dips. Larger ones are popular for breakfast and were often used as provisions for travellers.

See also
Fish fry
 List of Jamaican dishes

References

Jamaican cuisine
Fish dishes